The 'Lakshmanbhog' mango is a mango cultivar from West Bengal in India. It is grown in orchards spanning over 32,000 hectares in the Maldah district. The Government of West Bengal had chosen Lakshmanbhog as a variety to be exported to the United States.

References

Mango cultivars of India
Agriculture in West Bengal